Aderemi Raymond Desmond Renner-Thomas (born 7th September 1945- 17th November, 2022) was a former Chief Justice of Sierra Leone.

An ethnic Creole, Thomas was born and raised in Freetown, Sierra Leone's capital. He later obtained a PhD in land law. In 2005, he was appointed to the position of chief justice by former president, Ahmad Tejan Kabbah. In 2008 Renner-Thomas retired as chief justice. The president Ernest Bai Koroma appointed Umu Hawa Tejan Jalloh as his successor. He currently works as a lawyer in Freetown. He passed away on the 17th November, 2022. 

Ade has been married to Jennifer Renner-Thomas (née Bankole-Jones) for over 40 years. In 1988 they had twin girls Janine Renner-Thomas and Jacqueline Renner-Thomas, who currently live and work in London.  Jennifer lives with Ade in Freetown and is the director of the MEPS Trust Well Woman Clinic.

Works

Renner-Thomas, Ade. (2010). Land Tenure in Sierra Leone: The Law, Dualism and the Making of a Land Policy. Authorhouse. .

References

1945 births
Living people
Sierra Leone Creole people
20th-century Sierra Leonean lawyers
People from Freetown
People educated in Freetown, Sierra Leone
Chief justices of Sierra Leone
Fourah Bay College alumni
21st-century Sierra Leonean judges